Henry Kulczyk is a former American politician from Idaho. Kulczyk is a former Republican member of Idaho House of Representatives.

Career 
On November 5, 2002, Kulczyk won the election and became a Republican member of Idaho House of Representatives for District 14, seat B. Kulczyk defeated Sue Stadler and Glida Bothwell with 59.3% of the votes. Kulczyk's nickname was "Red-Light Henry".

In March 2004, Kulczyk was among the protestors against the removal of controversial Ten Commandments,a 1.5 ton monument, from Julia Davis Park. Kulczyk was arrested after he allegedly refused to leave as the monument was moved.

References 

Living people
Republican Party members of the Idaho House of Representatives
Year of birth missing (living people)
Place of birth missing (living people)
American political activists